Modrý or Modry  (feminine form Modrá or Modra ) is a Czech and Slovak surname. It is derived from the Czech–Slovak word modrý for "blue", originally probably a nickname for a "blue eyed" person.
People with the name include:
 Bohumil Modrý (1916–1963), Czechoslovak ice hockey player
 Jaroslav Modrý (born 1971), Czech former professional ice hockey defenseman

See also 
 Modra (surname)
 Modrá

References

Czech-language surnames
Slovak-language surnames
Surnames from nicknames